Huinculsaurus (meaning "Huincul Formation lizard") is a genus of noasaurid dinosaur from the Huincul Formation in Neuquén Province, Argentina. The type and only species is Huinculsaurus montesi. It was probably around  when fully grown, although this is only speculation since no fully mature specimens are currently known.

Discovery and naming

Huinculsaurus is only known from three thoracic and two sacral vertebrae from an immature individual, discovered . It was discovered ten meters away from where the Ilokelesia holotype was discovered and the vertebrae were mechanically separated during preparation. The genus was eventually named in 2020.

Classification
Huinculsaurus was placed in the Elaphrosaurinae subfamily of Noasauridae in 2020. It was most closely related to Elaphrosaurus and Limusaurus, both from the Late Jurassic. This would make Huinculsaurus the youngest known elaphrosaurine.

References 

Abelisaurs
Late Cretaceous dinosaurs of South America
Cretaceous Argentina
Huincul Formation
Fossil taxa described in 2020